The 2009 World Indoor Target Archery Championships were held in Rzeszów, Poland from April 3 to 8, 2009. A total of 37 countries participated.

Medal summary (individual)

Medal summary (team)

Medal tally

External links

 

E
World Indoor Archery Championships
Sport in Rzeszów
Sport in Podkarpackie Voivodeship
World Indoor Archery Championships
International archery competitions hosted by Poland